Kuri is a village in Pindra tehsil, Varanasi district, Uttar Pradesh, India.

References 

Villages in Varanasi district